The 1997 St. Louis Rams season was the team's 60th year with the National Football League (NFL) and the third season in St. Louis. Still struggling to find answers, the Rams looked to improve on their 6–10 record from 1996 and make the playoffs for the first time since 1989, when the team was still based in Anaheim. The Rams started out the season mediocre, splitting their first four games. However, after beating the New York Giants at home, things began to unravel, as the Rams lost their next eight games before winning three of their last four to end the season 5–11. This was Dick Vermeil’s first season as head coach of the Rams. Despite the losing record, Vermeil had brought the Rams back to competitiveness. Of their 5-11 record, five of those losses were only by a touchdown or less.

Offseason

NFL Draft

Roster

Regular season

Schedule

Standings

References

External links 
 1997 St. Louis Rams Rams at Pro-Football-Reference.com

St. Louis Rams
St. Louis Rams seasons
St Lou